Chubeh (also Romanized as Chūbeh, Chūbah, and Chubakh) is a village in Khandan Rural District, Tarom Sofla District, Qazvin County, Qazvin Province, Iran. At the 2006 census, its population was 59, in 21 families.

References 

Populated places in Qazvin County